Otzolotepec is a municipality in Mexico State in Mexico. The municipality covers an area of  127.95 km2.

As of 2005, the municipality had a total population of 67,611.

References

Municipalities of the State of Mexico
Populated places in the State of Mexico